Bigg Boss Marathi 2 is the second season of the Bigg Boss Marathi of the reality television show Bigg Boss broadcast in India. The grand premiere was held on 26 May 2019 on Colors Marathi and Mahesh Manjrekar as the host with the tagline Maza Ball, Mazi Bat, Maze Stump. The Grand Finale aired on 1 September 2019 and Shiv Thakare was declared as the winner and Neha Shitole as the Runner-Up.

Production

Ratings 
During lockdown in India due to the Covid-19 pandemic, in week 22 of 2020, the show's repeat telecast received 0.5 TRP by gaining fifth position in Top 5 Marathi TV shows.

Teaser 
On 18 March 2019, the makers released the first promo on Colors Marathi. The start of season was delayed for a month due to Lok Sabha Elections 2019.

Eye logo
The border of the eye is golden and has a purple background. There is electricity type inside the eye and yellow lines come from the middle of the eye.

House 
For the second season of Bigg Boss Marathi, a lavish house set was constructed in Goregaon Film City, Mumbai And this time the theme of the house is 'Royal Wada'. The prize money for the winner is Rs. 25 Lakhs.

Most of the rules are carried forward from the previous season, whereas"Adgalichi Kholi" (Jail) was introduced in Bigg Boss Marathi from this season.

Voting 
As Bigg Boss online voting has begun, viewers can vote for their favorite contestant through Voot.

Special episode 
 26 May 2019 (Grand Premiere)
 1 September 2019 (Grand Finale)

2 hours 
 14–16 June 2019
 29 June 2019
 30 June 2019
 5 July 2019
 7 July 2019
 19 July 2019
 11 August 2019

Housemates status

Housemates

Original entrants
15 Housemates entered on Day 1.
 Kishori Shahane - A popular Marathi film and television actress. She is married to Hindi filmmaker Deepak Balraj Vij. She has also appeared in Hindi films like Simran. She also played supporting roles in Shakti - Astitva Ke Ehsaas Ki and Ishq Mein Marjawan.
 Neha Shitole - Film and television actress who appeared briefly in Anurag Kashyap and Vikramaditya Motwane's Sacred Games.
 Shiv Thakare - Reality TV star, known for participating in MTV Roadies Rising.
 Shivani Surve - Television actress. She known for her lead role in Devyani and Jaana Na Dil Se Door.
 Vaishali Mhade - Singer, who won the Sa Re Ga Ma Pa Challenge 2009, also joined the reality show. She is also known for singing Bajirao Mastani's "Pinga" song with Shreya Ghoshal and Kalanks Ghar More Pardesiya.
 Surekha Punekar - Lavani dancer.
 Veena Jagtap - Television actress. She is known for her lead role in Radha Prem Rangi Rangali.
 Abhijit Kelkar - A Marathi film actor known for Me Shivajiraje Bhosale Boltoy and Sound of Heaven: The Story of Balgandharva.
 Digamber Naik - A Marathi actor and comedian. He did many roles in films and television. He is known for his appearance in Fu Bai Fu. 
 Vidyadhar (Bappa) Joshi - Film actor. He is known for films like Ekta Ek Power, Marathi Tigers, and Double Seat.
 Rupali Bhosale - Television actress. She known for her performance in Sony Sab's Badi Door Se Aaye Hain. She also did roles in Man Udhan Varyache, Don Kinare Doghi Aapan, Shejari Shejari Pakke Shejari, etc.
 Maitthily Jawkar - She is one of the most famous actresses in Marathi cinema. She rules the rural part of Maharashtra.
 Maadhav Deochake - A Marathi actor known for appearing in the Star Plus show Hamari Devrani and film Chintamani. He also did roles in Saraswati, Devyani, Tuza Maza Breakup, etc. 
 Abhijit Bichukale - A politician. 
 Parag Kanhere - A Celebrity Chef.

Wild-Card entrants
 Heena Panchal - Bollywood dancer. She is most famous for her item songs.
 Aroh Welankar - Marathi movie actor known for Films like Rege & Ghanta.

Weekly summary
The main events in the house are summarised in the table below. A typical week began with nominations, followed by the daily task, and then the eviction of a housemate during the Saturday episode. Evictions, tasks, and other events for a particular week are noted in order of sequence.

Nominations table
Color key
  Abhijit B's Team (Week 1-2)
  Vaishali's Team (Week 1-2)
  Not in House (Week 1-2)

  indicates that the Housemate was directly nominated for eviction.
  indicates that the Housemate was immune prior to nominations.
  indicates the winner.
  indicates the first runner up.
  indicates the second runner up.
  indicates the third runner up.
  indicates the contestant has been evicted.
  indicates the contestant walked out due to emergency.
  indicates the contestant has been ejected.
  house captain.
  indicates the contestant is nominated.

Nomination notes
: On Day 20, Shivani walked out from the house due to health issues. Heena entered the house as the first wild card Entry.
: Abhijeet B was arrested from the house following a court case.
: Parag was removed from the house because of violence.
: On Day 48, Shivani re-entered the house.
: On Day 55, Aroh entered the house as 2nd wild-card contestant.
: Aroh murdered Neha while entering in the House, as a part of his entry.
: Maadhav saved Neha for week 10 after elimination
: On Day 64, Abhijit B re-entered the house as guest contestant.
: On Day 86, Ex-contestants nominated members for final week.

Guest appearances

Through Direct Contact

Through Video Conferencing

References

External links
 Bigg Boss Marathi 2 at Facebook
 
 Bigg Boss Marathi 2 at Voot

2019 Indian television seasons
02
Marathi-language television shows
Colors Marathi original programming